Dinghu may refer to the following locations in China:

Dinghu District, Zhaoqing, Guangdong
Dinghu Mountain, in Zhaoqing, Guangdong
Dinghu, Anhui, town in Si County
Dinghu, Hunan, town in Linxiang
Dinghu, Jiangxi, town in Anyi County